Godfrey Taita (born 26 February 1986) is a retired Tanzanian football midfielder.

References

1986 births
Living people
Tanzanian footballers
Tanzania international footballers
Kagera Sugar F.C. players
Young Africans S.C. players
Maji Maji F.C. players
Association football midfielders
Tanzanian Premier League players